The Parapsychology Foundation is a non-profit organisation founded in 1951 by the medium Eileen J. Garrett and Frances Payne Bolton, Ohio's first female representative in Congress. The foundation is based in New York. They offer grants and scholarships to those undertaking study in the paranormal. The organization also founded the Eileen J. Garrett Library, in Greenport.

Garrett claimed to be a medium and founded the organization with the explicit purpose of scientifically proving the existence of the soul.

The current executive director is Lisette Coly, granddaughter of Garrett. At one point the organisation owned a conference centre in Saint-Paul-de-Vence, France and has subsequently hosted numerous conferences. At their New York headquarters, they host numerous lecture series. As of 2001 the organisation had 200 active researchers. The organisation publishes the International Journal of Parapsychology.

References

Parapsychology
Paranormal organizations

External links
 Official website